Dennis Neuman (born October 18, 1989) is a Dutch professional baseball player and scout. A pitcher, he has pitched in the Boston Red Sox organization and for the Netherlands national baseball team.

Neuman competed for Curaçao in the Little League World Series, leading the team to a third-place finish. He pitched for the Red Sox organization from 2007 through 2011, appearing in the South Atlantic League All-Star Game in 2010. He was a member of the 2009 World Baseball Classic.

On December 21, 2012, the Red Sox announced that they have hired Neuman to be a scout in Curacao and Aruba.

References

External links

1989 births
2009 World Baseball Classic players
Baseball pitchers
Boston Red Sox scouts
Curaçao baseball players
Curaçao expatriate baseball players in the United States
Greenville Drive players
Gulf Coast Red Sox players
Living people
Lowell Spinners players
Pawtucket Red Sox players
People from Willemstad
Salem Red Sox players